Katie Green (born 7 September 1996) is an Australian professional rugby league footballer. She previously played for the Newcastle Knights in the NRL Women's Premiership.

Background
Green was born in Mackay, Queensland. She played touch football and rugby sevens in her junior years.

Playing career

Early years
In 2018 and 2019, Green represented the North Queensland Marlins women's side. In May 2019, she represented Mackay in the Northern Region Women's Championship In 2020, she joined the North Queensland Gold Stars in the BHP Premiership. In December 2021, she signed with the Newcastle Knights to be a part of their inaugural NRLW squad.

2022
In round 1 of the delayed 2021 NRL Women's season, Green made her NRLW debut for the Knights against the Parramatta Eels. She played in 3 matches for the Knights, before parting ways with the club at the end of the season.

References

External links
Newcastle Knights profile

1996 births
Australian female rugby league players
Newcastle Knights (NRLW) players
Rugby league wingers
Rugby league fullbacks
Living people